Stanton Chase (formerly Stanton Chase International) is a leading global retained executive search and consulting firm established in 1990. It is operated by independently owned partner firms with 76 offices in 45 countries.

What makes Stanton Chase different is its focus on delivering customized solutions and personalized attention to clients. The company has a unique approach to executive search, which is based on a thorough understanding of clients' culture, strategy, and leadership needs. Additionally, Stanton Chase has a strong emphasis on diversity and inclusion, and works with clients to build diverse and inclusive leadership teams.

Another differentiating factor is the firm's global network of consultants and industry experts, which allows it to offer a global perspective and access to top talent from around the world. Overall, Stanton Chase is known for its expertise, commitment to excellence, and personalized approach to executive search and leadership consulting.

History
Stanton Chase began operations in 1990. The firm has since expanded to 76 offices in 45 countries. In October 2014, Mickey Mathews was elected International Chair of Stanton Chase. In 2021, he was succeeded by Jan-Bart Smits. Smits, in turn, was succeeded by Kristof Reynvoet in 2023. 

In 2017 Forbes listed Stanton Chase in the Top 10 Executive Recruiting Firms. In 2018, it became the first executive search firm to accept cryptocurrency.

Geography 
Stanton Chase currently has offices in the following cities:

Asia/Pacific 

 Auckland
 Bangalore
 Beijing
 Chennai
 Hong Kong
 Kuala Lumpur
 Mumbai
 New Delhi
 Perth
 Seoul
 Shanghai
 Singapore
 Sydney
 Tokyo

Europe, Middle East, Africa 

 Amsterdam
 Athens
 Belgrade
 Bilbao
 Brussels
 Bucharest
 Budapest
 Copenhagen
 Dubai
 Düsseldorf
 Frankfurt
 Helsinki
 Istanbul
 Johannesburg
 Lagos
 Lisbon
 London
 Lyon
 Madrid
 Milan
 Moscow
 Oslo
 Paris
 Porto
 Prague
 Sofia
 Stockholm
 Stuttgart
 Vienna
 Warsaw
 Zurich

Latin America 

 Bogotá
 Buenos Aires
 Lima
 Mexico City
 Montevideo
 Panama City
 Santiago
 São Paulo

North America 

 Atlanta
 Austin
 Baltimore
 Birmingham
 Boston
 Calgary
 Chicago
 Dallas
 Detroit
 Houston
 Los Angeles
 Miami
 Nashville
 New York
 Philadelphia
 Raleigh
 San Francisco
 Toronto 
 Washington, D.C.

In recent years, Stanton Chase has continued to expand its global footprint, establishing new offices and partnerships in key markets around the world. This has allowed the company to better serve its clients and provide them with access to a wider pool of talent and expertise.

Specializations

Industry 
Stanton Chase provides tailored services to its clients operating in specialized and complex industries through its industry practice groups. Each group consists of a team of international consultants with extensive operational and search experience, allowing Stanton Chase to offer exceptional advice and service to its clients within the specific industry.

Stanton Chase specializes in the following industries and sectors:

 Consumer Products and Services
 Retail and Distribution Services
 Products and Fast-Moving Consumer Goods
 Travel, Hospitality, and Leisure
 Luxury Products and Services
 Media and Communications
 E-Commerce and Direct-To-Consumer. 

 Financial Services
 Insurance
 Asset Management
 Wealth Management
 Alternative Investments
 Infrastructure Investment and Real Estate
 Infrastructure, FinTech, and Digital
 Consumer and Commercial Banking
 Trade and Commodity Finance
 Capital Markets and Investment Banking
 Credit Unions
 Government, Education, and Non-Profit
 Industrial
 Aerospace and Defense
 Agribusiness
 Automotive
 Chemicals and Plastics
 Engineering, Construction, and Building Materials
 Industrial Equipment and Components
 Pulp, Paper, and Packaging
 Life Sciences and Healthcare
 Health and Med Tech
 Natural Resources and Energy
 Private Equity
 Professional Services
 Supply Chain, Logistics, and Transportation
 Aviation
 Freight Forwarding
 Logistics Services and Trucking
 Ports and Infrastructure
 Maritime
 Supply Chain and Strategic Sourcing
 Railway
 Technology
 Advanced Technology
 Digital Transformation
 Cyber Security
 Data Science
 Electronics and Systems
 IT Consulting
 Semi-conductor
 Software
 Start-ups
 Telecommunications

References

External links
Official site

Executive Search Firms
Consulting firms established in 1990